PhysMath Central was an imprint of Springer Science+Business Media, publishing online open-access scientific journals in physics and mathematics and operated by BioMed Central. It was active from 2007 until 2011.

Journals published were:
 PMC Physics A
 PMC Physics B
 PMC Biophysics

PMC Physics A and B were discontinued in 2011 in favor of EPJ Open, the open-access component of the European Physical Journal. PMC Biophysics was relaunched as BMC Biophysics within the BioMed Central journal family.

References

External links 
 

Springer Science+Business Media imprints
Online-only journals
Physics journals